Comin' Thro the Rye is a 1923 British silent drama film directed by Cecil Hepworth and starring Alma Taylor and Ralph Forbes. The film was based on the 1875 novel of the same name by Helen Mathers. The title alludes to the Robert Burns 1782 poem "Comin' Through the Rye".
 
A clip of it is seen in the comedy The Smallest Show on Earth (1957), in which the elderly staff of the old fleapit cinema tearfully watch silent films on their evenings off.

Plot
The story of a young girl who is prevented from marrying the man she loves by the machinations of a designing woman. The plot centres on the heroine, Helen Adair, who is courted by George Tempest but who meets and falls in love with Paul Vasher. Vasher's former love Sylvia Fleming who has betrayed him, is jealous of his affections for Helen and manages by intercepting mail between the lovers to plot to win him back.

While Vasher is abroad she places a false announcement of the marriage of Helen and George in the Times and in his despair at this news he agrees to marry her. Sylvia is trapped in a loveless marriage, Helen retains her virtue, Vasher never forgets his love for Helen and in a final letter from the battlefield writes to his true love telling her he will meet her 'Comin' through the rye'.

Cast
Alma Taylor as Helen Adair
 Shayle Gardner as Paul Vasher
 Eileen Dennes as Sylvia Fleming
Ralph Forbes as George Tempest
James Carew as Col. Adair
Francis Lister as Dick Fellowes
 Gwynne Herbert as Mrs. Adair
Henry Vibart as Mr. Tempest
 Christine Rayner as Jane Peach
Nancy Price as Mrs. Titmouse
 John MacAndrews as Simpkins
 Margot Armstrong as Alice Adair

References

External links

 Comin' Thro the Rye at BFI Film & TV Database
 Comin' Thro the Rye at Silent Era
 Comin' Thro the Rye at Hepworth film

Further reading
Raising the Flag: Constructing a National Cinema in Britain, Andrew Higson.  Oxford: Clarendon Press, 1995, .  Chapter on Comin' Thro the Rye: pp. 26–97.

1923 films
1920s historical drama films
Films based on British novels
Films directed by Cecil Hepworth
British black-and-white films
British silent feature films
British historical drama films
Films set in the 19th century
Hepworth Pictures films
1923 drama films
1920s English-language films
1920s British films
Silent drama films